Clark County State Lake is a reservoir located in Appleton Township, Clark County in the U.S. State of Kansas. The lake is accessed by Route K-94.

References 

Reservoirs in Kansas